Growth Catalyst Partners (GCP) is a private equity firm based in Chicago.

History
In March 2020, GCP acquired from Atlantic Media its Government Executive Media Group, including its publications Government Executive, Nextgov, Defense One, and Route Fifty, for an undisclosed sum.

References

American news websites
Private equity firms